The 2022 Texas Senate election were held on November 8, 2022. Elections were held to elect senators from all 31 senate districts across the state of Texas. Numerous other federal, state, and local elections, also held on this date. The winners of this election served in the Eighty-eighth Texas Legislature, with seats apportioned among the 2020 United States census. Republicans had held a majority in the Texas Senate since January 14, 1997, as a result of the 1996 elections.

Retirements
As of April 2022, 6 state senators, including 4 Republicans and 2 Democrats, have decided to retire, 1 of whom is seeking another office.

Republicans
 Texas Senate, District 11: Larry Taylor is retiring.
 Texas Senate, District 12: Jane Nelson is retiring.
 Texas Senate, District 24: Dawn Buckingham is retiring to run for Texas Land Commissioner.
 Texas Senate, District 31: Kel Seliger is retiring.

Democrats
 Texas Senate, District 10: Beverly Powell is retiring.
 Texas Senate, District 27: Eddie Lucio Jr. is retiring.

Predictions

Polling

Senate District 27 
General election

Generic Democrat vs. generic Republican

Results summary

Close races

Senate Districts

See also
2022 United States House of Representatives elections in Texas
2022 Texas gubernatorial election
2022 Texas Attorney General election
2022 United States state legislative elections
2022 Texas House of Representatives election
2022 Texas elections

Notes

Notes

Partisan clients

References

2022 Texas elections
Texas Senate
Texas State Senate elections